Phyllis MacMahon is an Irish actress. She is known for her work in films such as 10 Rillington Place (1971) in which she played Muriel Eady, the first woman murdered in the film by Richard Attenborough's John Christie, Leo the Last (1970), I Don't Want to Be Born (1975), The Magdalene Sisters (2002) and Shaun of the Dead (2004). She also played an Irish nurse in John Mackenzie's Made (1972). She typically plays nuns, prostitutes or old aunts.

Filmography

References

External links
 

English film actresses
20th-century English actresses
21st-century English actresses
1935 births
Living people